1 fille & 4 types (meaning 1 Girl & 4 Guys) is a twelfth French-language and twentieth studio album by Canadian singer Celine Dion, released by Columbia Records on 13 October 2003. 1 fille & 4 types features thirteen songs written and arranged by Jean-Jacques Goldman, Erick Benzi, Jacques Veneruso, and Gildas Arzel, and produced by Benzi. The first single from the album, "Tout l'or des hommes" reached top ten in all Francophone countries, including number one in Quebec and number three in France. It was followed by "Et je t'aime encore" and "Contre nature".

1 fille & 4 types received favourable reviews from music critics, some of whom noticed that it is a record that many Dion fans were hoping would arrive one day. On the commercial level, the album also became a success. It topped the charts in Canada, France, Belgium Wallonia and Greece, and also reached top ten in Switzerland, Poland, Finland and Belgium Flandres. 1 fille & 4 types was certified 2× Platinum in France, Platinum in Belgium and Switzerland, and Gold in Finland.

Background
Dion started working on her upcoming French-language album on 8 October 2002 in Paris when she met with four well-known French songwriters and producers: Jean-Jacques Goldman, Erick Benzi, Jacques Veneruso, and Gildas Arzel. After four days of rehearsals, Dion met with them again in Las Vegas in May 2003, during her break from performing in A New Day.... The songs were recorded between 2–11 May 2003. On 11 August 2003, Dion's official website announced that the release of the new French album titled 1 fille & 4 types (meaning 1 Girl & 4 Guys) was set for 13 October 2003 in Europe and 14 October 2003 in Canada. Dion worked on this project with "4 Guys" only: Goldman, Benzi, Veneruso and Arzel. Goldman, who wrote and produced the best-selling French-language albums of all time: D'eux and S'il suffisait d'aimer, guided 1 fille & 4 types as the artistic director. The first single, "Tout l'or des hommes" was sent to radio on 27 August 2003. It was written by Jacques Veneruso who wrote Dion's 2001 number-one hit, "Sous le vent". The music video for the song was serviced to video outlets in September 2003 and the CD single was scheduled for release on 6 October 2003 in France, Switzerland and Belgium, on 7 October 2003 in Canada and a few weeks later in Germany. The behind the scenes from "Tout l'or des hommes" video and making of the album was posted in the video section on celinedion.com on 28 September 2003. 1 fille & 4 types was also scheduled for release in the United States on 11 November 2003, in Japan on 17 December 2003, in Sweden on 9 February 2004 and in Spain on 19 April 2004.

Content
On 14 September 2003, the track listing for the album containing twelve songs was posted on celinedion.com. On 23 September 2003, it was revealed that 1 fille & 4 types will be released in three different versions. While the standard edition was available from all retailers, a Deluxe Edition with special photos and a DVD was sold in Europe and exclusively in Archambault stores in Canada. Finally, the Limited Edition with a special 45-page booklet will be available in France's Carrefour stores. After the album was released it turned out that it contains a hidden track, "Valse adieu". The songs were written and arranged by Jean-Jacques Goldman, Erick Benzi, Jacques Veneruso and Gildas Arzel, and produced by Benzi. Jean-Jacques Goldman's brother, J Kapler co-wrote "Et je t'aime encore" and wrote "Valse adieu". Goldman, Benzi, Veneruso and Arzel also played instruments and sang lead and background vocals on the album. The album contains three covers: "Retiens-moi" recorded by Nanette Workman for her 1996 album Une à une, "Tu nages" recorded by Anggun for her 2000 album Désirs contraires, and "Rien n'est vraiment fini" recorded by Leyla Doriane for her 2000 album Libre. "Et je t'aime encore" is a French-language version of the song "Je t'aime encore" from One Heart which was released in March 2003.

Promotion
To promote the album, Dion taped a television special at The Colosseum at Caesars Palace in Las Vegas on 1 October 2003. The footage from this show was used to create two television specials, one for Canada and the second for France. During the first television special for Canada titled 1 fille & 4 types à Las Vegas, Dion was interviewed by Julie Snyder and short clips of performances form The Colosseum at Caesars Palace were shown, including: "Le loup, la biche et le chevalier (une chanson douce)" (duet with Henri Salvador), "Je lui dirai", "Apprends-moi", "Mon homme", "Quand on n'a que l'amour" (duet with the winner of Star Académie), "Sous le vent" (duet with Garou), "Contre nature", "Toi et moi" (duet with Charles Aznavour), "Tout l'or des hommes", "Et je t'aime encore", "Ne bouge pas" and "Le vol d'un ange". The show was broadcast on 19 October 2003 on TVA and attracted 1,536,500 viewers becoming the most watched program in Quebec that day.

The second television special for France, Céline! was hosted by Flavie Flament and included the full performances of the following songs: "Tout l'or des hommes" (with "4 Guys": Jean-Jacques Goldman, Erick Benzi, Jacques Veneruso and Gildas Arzel), "On ne change pas", "Toi et moi" (with Charles Aznavour), "Et je t'aime encore", "Pour que tu m'aimes encore" (duet with Florent Pagny), "Le vol d'un ange", "Apprends-moi" (with "4 Guys"), "Le loup, la biche et le chevalier (une chanson douce)" (with Henri Salvador), "Sous le vent" (with Garou), "S'il suffisait d'aimer" (with Patrick Fiori, Florent Pagny and Roch Voisine) and "Valse adieu" (with "4 Guys"). The show also included solo performances by the special guests: Roch Voisine, Garou, Florent Pagny, Patrick Fiori, Michael Jones, Jean-Jacques Goldman, Charles Aznavour, Gérard Darmon, Martin Fontaine, Henry Salvador and Ricky Martin. The television special was broadcast on 18 November 2003 on TF1 and became the most watched program of the French prime-time by attracting 6,131,800 viewers and getting the 31,1% share of the audience.

On 15 October 2003, Dion returned to The Colosseum at Caesars Palace in Las Vegas to perform her show, A New Day.... Therefore, she could not promote the album the way she used to do with her previous releases.

Singles
The first single, "Tout l'or des hommes" was released on 6 October 2003 and reached number one in Quebec, number two in Canada, number three in France, number five in Belgium Wallonia and number ten in Switzerland. It was also certified Silver in France. The second single, "Et je t'aime encore" was sent to radio on 11 December 2003 and the limited edition CD single was released on 23 February 2004. The music video for "Et je t'aime encore" premiered on 8 March 2004. "Et je t'aime encore" reached number two in Quebec, number fourteen in Belgium Wallonia, number sixteen in France and number thirty-one in Switzerland. The cover art for the next promotional only single, "Contre nature" was released to TeamCeline members on 6 March 2004. "Contre nature" was sent to radio in France on 18 March 2004 and in Canada on 12 April 2004. The music video, directed by Didier Kerbrat in Las Vegas, premiered on 30 April 2004. The song reached number two in Quebec. "Je lui dirai" was later included on Dion's next album, Miracle and released as a promotional single in October 2004.

Critical reception

The album met with favourable reviews from music critics. A reviewer from the Montreal Gazette called the album the "most sympathetic and intimate work of her career". The French newspaper Le Parisien gave it a rating of excellent, while the Swiss newspaper Le Matin wrote "It's solid Dion, square and effectively devilish". Rob Theakston from AllMusic wrote that 1 fille & 4 types "is a record that many Dion fans were hoping would arrive one day. Her voice values dynamics over acrobatics and the band is stripped down to its bare essentials, taking Dion into relatively unfamiliar territories such as country-pop and folk, and she proves herself more than up to the task of delivering top-notch performances every time. This stripped-down, back-to-basics attitude is only further reinforced within the album's packaging: Dion in several fashionably rugged poses that could have come straight from an Abercrombie & Fitch catalog complete with photos of a rugged life 'on the road,' including a shot of her with the band all lying on a bed together with her hair up in a towel and the air conditioner apparently not working during the summertime. It's completely premeditated and no diva in her right mind would stand for such living conditions, but this only reinforces how far away Dion wants to distance herself from her image this time around. The pop songs are equally as infectious as they are hummable". Entertainment Weekly editor David Browne wrote a mixed review "The presentation cries out empress of overkill goes alt-rock, but the truth is much less engaging" and said that album "does stand as a marked departure from her usual fare. Forsaking orchestras and pop gloss, she and her guys offer up reverby twang in "Tout l'or des hommes," a slide-guitar romp in "Ne bouge pas," and enough mopey, semi-unplugged arrangements to make you think they just discovered Bruce Springsteen's "Tunnel of Love". For her part, Dion sounds more restrained than on her English-language extravaganzas. The album falls victim to the same bathetic love songs that cripple every Dion project, and the quasi-adventurous production gives way to drippy folk-pop balladry".

Commercial performance
Dion rocketed to the top of the Canadian chart for the second time in less than seven months. Her French-language album 1 fille & 4 types accomplished the feat with first-week sales of 44,532 copies, including 42,500 units sold in Quebec alone. It marked her sixth number-one album in the SoundScan era and her fourth to debut at the top position. Dion's previous album One Heart entered the chart at number one in April 2003 selling 97,000 copies. 1 fille & 4 types stayed at number one for the second week, selling 19,300 units. In the third week, it fell to number seven with sales of 8,300 copies. The album has sold over 100,000 units in Canada in 2003. It also debuted at number one in Quebec and stayed at the top for three weeks.

In France, 1 fille & 4 types debuted at number one selling 123,600 copies and remained at the top for four non-consecutive weeks. On 18 December 2003, 1 fille & 4 types was certified 2× Platinum for shipping 600,000 copies and it became the fifth best-selling album of 2003. It has sold over 750,000 copies in France.

1 fille & 4 types also reached number one in Belgium Wallonia for two consecutive weeks, and peaked at number one in Greece, number two in Switzerland, number seven in Poland, number nine in Belgium Flandres and Finland, and eventually reached number nine on the European Top 100 Albums. It was certified Platinum in Belgium and Switzerland, and Gold in Finland.

Accolades

In December 2003, 1 fille & 4 types was nominated for the NRJ Music Award in category Best French-Language Album of the Year. In February 2004, Dion received four nominations for the Juno Awards of 2004, including Francophone Album of the Year for 1 fille & 4 types, Artist of the Year and Fan Choice Award. In September 2004, she received three nominations for the Félix Awards, including Best-Selling Album of the Year for 1 fille & 4 types and Female Artist of the Year.

Track listing
All tracks produced by Erick Benzi.

Personnel

 Gildas Arzel – arranger, guitars, harmonica, lead vocal, background vocals
 Christophe Battaglia – arranger
 Erick Benzi – producer, arranger, engineer, programming, synthesizers, lead vocal, background vocals
 Yvan Cassar – strings director and arranger
 Laurent Coppola – drums
 Humberto Gatica – engineer, mix
 Jean-Jacques Goldman – artistic director, arranger, guitars, lead vocal, background vocals
 Patrick Hampartzoumian – arranger, programming, synthesizers
 Yannick Hardouin – bass
 Thomas Ivaldy – engineer's assistant
 Steve Kadison – engineer's assistant
 Dimitri Kurts – engineer's assistant
 François Lalonde – engineer's assistant
 Gildas Lointier – engineer
 Vito Luprano – executive producer
 Vlado Meller – mastering
 Nicolas Mingot – guitars
 Simon Rhodes – engineer
 Bruno Le Rouzic – flutes, uilleann pipes
 Jacques Veneruso – arranger, guitars, lead vocal, background vocals

Charts

Weekly charts

Year-end charts

Certifications and sales

Release history

See also
 List of number-one albums of 2003 (Canada)
 List of number-one singles of 2003 (France)

References

External links
 

2003 albums
Albums produced by Erick Benzi
Celine Dion albums
French-language albums